"Berlin Zachodni" is a Polish-language punk rock song by band Big Cyc. The song was released in 1990 and appeared on the album Z partyjnym pozdrowieniem, released by Polskie Nagrania Muza record label. The song was about impoverished people from the Polish People's Republic, who traveled to West Berlin in the 1980s, with hopes of selling smuggled products for profit.

History 
In 1989, Big Cyc band performed in West Berlin during the Schwarze Tage festival. The band was inspired to write the song "Berlin Zachodni" after their visit to West Berlin, where they noted the high number of vendors and smugglers among people traveling there from Polish People's Republic.

In 1990, the band recorded "Berlin Zachodni", together with other new songs, in the Izabelin Studio. Soon after, the song was played in various radio stations, including the Polskie Radio Program III. It reached number four on the Lista Przebojów Programu Trzeciego music record. Soon after, the band signed a contract with the Polskie Nagrania Muza record label, with whom they released their 1990 album Z partyjnym pozdrowieniem, which included "Berlin Zachodni".

In 1991, the song was awarded the title of the best hit song of the year, in the poll of the magazine Teraz Rock.

The song was included on the band's 1994 album Nie zapomnisz nigdy, released by BMG Ariola PL.

Personnel 
 main vocals: Jacek Jędrzejak, Jarosław Lis
 support vocals: Krzysztof Skiba, Roman Lechowicz
 bass guitar: Jacek Jędrzejak
 drums: Jarosław Lis
 music production: Jan Lizikowski
 sound production: Andrzej Puczyński
 album cover design: Piotr Łopatka
 music video cinematography: Paweł Zimnicki

Notes

References 

1990 songs
Polish-language songs
Punk rock songs
Songs about Berlin
Songs about poverty